Indian Empress is a Luxury yacht, measuring  in length, and is the 53rd longest motor yacht in the world. Launched in 2000 as Al Mirqab, she had her hull assembled in Durban, South Africa, and then finished at the Oceanco yard in the Netherlands to the design of the A Group. 
Indian Empress is powered by three 10,000-hp MTU 20-cylinder engines with speeds available of up to 24 knots.

Previous ownership

The yacht was initially owned by the Qatari Royal Family. Indian businessman Vijay Mallya bought the yacht in 2006 for an undisclosed purchase price.

Legal issues

During 2017, Mallya was suspected of financial crimes, which included non-payment of ship expenses and crew salaries. As Indian Empress was moored in Valletta, Malta at the time, the yacht was held there under court order, and then auctioned by the courts on June 28, 2018. The winning bid of €43.5 million was made by Maltese company Credityacht Ltd, on behalf of an unnamed Iranian client. They subsequently had seven days to deposit the funds, but failed to meet that deadline. Credityacht Ltd. then requested a 15-day extension to make the payment. The union for maritime workers, Nautilus International representing the up to 40 crew members who were owed collectively a reported €1 million-plus in unpaid salaries, accepted the request, but several other creditors declined.

The Maltese court then set a new date to re-auction the yacht after the first purchased attempt defaulted. The second auction was to be held on September 19, 2018. Serious bidders were required to deposit €1 million 48 hours in advance to take part in the auction. Credityacht Ltd., was banned from participating. The auction did not proceed however, as one day earlier, the court approved a €35 million private offer made by Sea Beauty Yachting Limited on behalf of unnamed clients. Credityacht was ordered to pay the difference between their initial bid and the final sale price as penalty for defaulting.

See also
 List of yachts built by Oceanco

References

Motor yachts
2000 ships